is a 1996 video game compilation developed and published by Konami. It was originally released for the Sega Saturn and PlayStation, and later for Windows computers a year later. It includes the first two games in the company's Gradius series of shoot'em ups — Gradius (1985) and Gradius II (1988) — alongside extras such as CG movies and minor changes to the included titles.

Gameplay

Development and release

Reception

Notes

References

PlayStation (console) games
Sega Saturn games
Windows games
Gradius video games
1996 video games
Konami video game compilations
Japan-exclusive video games
Video games developed in Japan
Video games scored by Miki Higashino